Nohor may refer to:
 Nohor, East Azerbaijan
 Nohor, Mazandaran